Conway River can refer to a number of rivers, including:

 Conway River, New Zealand
 Conway River (Virginia)
 River Conway, Wales, in North Wales, former spelling of the River Conwy.